In mathematics – more specifically, in functional analysis and numerical analysis – Stechkin's lemma is a result about the ℓq norm of the tail of a sequence, when the whole sequence is known to have finite ℓp norm.  Here, the term "tail" means those terms in the sequence that are not among the N largest terms, for an arbitrary natural number N.  Stechkin's lemma is often useful when analysing best-N-term approximations to functions in a given basis of a function space.  The result was originally proved by Stechkin in the case .

Statement of the lemma

Let  and let  be a countable index set. Then

where

.

Thus, Stechkin's lemma controls the ℓq norm of the tail of the sequence  (and hence the ℓq norm of the difference between the sequence and its approximation using its  largest terms)  in terms of the ℓp norm of the full sequence and an rate of decay.

References

   See Section 2.1 and Footnote 5.

Functional analysis
Numerical analysis
Inequalities
Lemmas in analysis